Anna Przybylska (26 December 1978 – 5 October 2014) was a Polish actress and model.

She was ranked high amongst the most beautiful Polish actresses and was chosen, in 2004, to be the Polish ambassador for the ASTOR cosmetics brand. Two years later, she became the European ambassador for ASTOR.

Biography 
Anna Przybylska was born in Gdynia.

In June 2000, after only 9 months of dating, she married Dominik Zygra, a businessman. They got divorced after a year. After the divorce, Anna started a relationship with the footballer Jarosław Bieniuk, with whom she had a daughter Oliwia (born October 18, 2002) and two sons: Szymon (born January 13, 2006) and Jan (born March 21, 2011).

At the end of July 2013, she underwent surgery to remove a pancreatic tumor in a clinic in Gdansk. She was also treated in Switzerland.  She died on 5 October 2014 at in her family home in Gdynia.  On October 9, 2014, she was buried in the grave of her father, in the cemetery at the Parish of St. Michael the Archangel in Gdynia.

After fighting pancreatic cancer for approximately a year, she died on 5 October 2014 at her home in Gdynia.

Media about her Life 
A biography was published in 2017 on her life called Ania, written by Grzegorz Kubicki, Maciej Drzewicki. The book was published in Polish.

A documentary film about her life, Ania, was released in 2022.

Filmography
Złotopolscy (1997, TV series) as Marylka Baka
Ciemna strona Venus (1997) as Suczka
Lot 001 (1999) as Julia
Sezon na Leszcza (2000) as a girl
Lokatorzy (2001) as Krysia's sister
Kariera Nikosia Dyzmy (2002) as Jadzia
Rób swoje ryzyko jest Twoje (2002) as Beata
Rózowa noc (2002) as Donata Fiok
 (2003, TV series) as Doctor Karina
Królowa chmur (2004) as Kasia
Pojedynek mistrzów (2004)
RH+ (2005) as Marta
Solidarność, Solidarność (2005) as secretary
Wszyscy jesteśmy Chrystusami (2006)
Ryś (2006) as Jolka
Dlaczego nie! (2006) as star
Lekcja pana Kuki (2007) as Alicja
Warsaw Dark aka Izolator (2008) as call-girl
Złoty Środek (2009) as Mirka and Mirek
Klub Szalonych Dziewic (2010) as Karolina
Bilet na księżyc (2013) as Halina "Roksana"

References

External links

Polish female models
Polish film actresses
Polish television actresses
20th-century Polish actresses
21st-century Polish actresses
1978 births
2014 deaths
People from Gdynia
Deaths from pancreatic cancer
Deaths from cancer in Poland